is a Japanese male artistic gymnast and freestyle skier. He has formerly competed as a gymnast and has participated at the gymnastic competitions until 2005 before switching on to take the sport of freestyle skiing in 2006. Naoya Tabara sustained a shoulder injury in 2005 when he was professional artistic gymnast which caused him to choose aerials freestyle skiing. He participated at the 2018 Winter Olympics and competed in the freestyle skiing men's aerials event.

Naoya most notably took part in the 2005 Gymnastics World Cup finishing sixth in the floor excise event. Naoya Tabara has competed in FIS World Championships and has represented Japan during the 2011 Asian Winter Games before being selected to represent Japan at the 2018 Winter Olympics. He is also the first Japanese male freestyle skier to secure a podium finish in aerials at a Skiing World Cup.

References 

1980 births
Living people
Japanese male artistic gymnasts
Japanese male freestyle skiers
Freestyle skiers at the 2018 Winter Olympics
Olympic freestyle skiers of Japan
Freestyle skiers at the 2011 Asian Winter Games
Sportspeople from Wakayama Prefecture
Universiade medalists in gymnastics
Universiade bronze medalists for Japan
Medalists at the 2003 Summer Universiade
20th-century Japanese people
21st-century Japanese people